The men's 100 metre breaststroke SB8' event at the 2022 Commonwealth Games was held on 31 July at the Sandwell Aquatics Centre.

Schedule
The schedule is as follows:

All times are British Summer Time (UTC+1)

Results

Final

References

Men's 100 metre breaststroke SB8